Jackpot is a 2013 Indian Hindi-language comedy thriller film directed by Kaizad Gustad starring Sunny Leone, Naseeruddin Shah, Sachiin J Joshi, and Bharath in the lead roles. This is the Bollywood debut of Tamil actor Bharath. The film released on 13 December 2013 in India. It had total earnings of  according to Box Office India.

Plot
Francis (Sachiin J Joshi) packs in the muscle and has a can of beer always close at hand. He is also street-smart enough to impress Maya (Sunny Leone), the oomphy voice of reason in the movie. Boss Man (Naseeruddin Shah) is a veteran raver whose clothes are as colorful as his principles and punchlines. Slow in speech but quick to draw a six-shooter, he owns the Jackpot casino.

Cast
 Naseeruddin Shah as Boss
 Sunny Leone as Maya
 Sachiin J Joshi as Francis
 Bharath as Anthony D’Souza
 Makrand Deshpande
 Manish Wadhwa
 Sumit Kumar
 Daniel Weber (cameo)

Filming
The majority of the shooting for the film was completed in Goa. Kaizad Gustad shot the film in 27 days.

Soundtrack
The soundtrack has 9 tracks. Sharib & Toshi, Mika, Remo Fernandes, Gods Robots (Shridevi Keshavan & Janaka Atugoda), Rishi Rich, Juno Reactor, Rahul Bhatt, Jaaved Jaaferi and Itek Bhutani composed one song each. The song "Kabhi Jo Baadal Barse" became popular.

Track listing
Song Title – Performed by – Music by – Lyrics by
 Kabhi Jo Baadal Barse – Arijit Singh – Sharib & Toshi – Turaz & Azeem Shirazi
 Full Jhol – Mika Singh, Akasa Singh – Mika Singh – Raj Hans 
 Bol Bugger Bol – Remo Fernandes – Remo Fernandes – Abhijeet Deshpande 
 Jackpot Jeetna – Sunidhi Chauhan – Gods Robots – Kaizad Gustad
 Kabhi Jo Baadal Barse (Remix) – Arijit Singh feat. Rishi Rich, Maxi Priest – Sharib & Toshi – Turaz & Azeem Shirazi
 Jackpot – Hamsika Iyer – Juno Reactor – Kaizad Gustad 
 Eggjactly – Jaaved Jaaferi – Rahul Bhatt – Jaaved Jaaferi
 Kabhi Jo Baadal Barse (Female) – Shreya Ghoshal – Sharib & Toshi – Turaz & Azeem Shirazi
 Now You See, Now You Don't – Ramya Iyer – Itek Bhutani – Kaizad Gustad & Ramya Iyer 
 Kabhi Jo Baadal Barse (Remix) – Arijit Singh – Sharib & Toshi – Turaz & Azeem Shirazi

Marketing
Censor Board axed the rap song 'Eggjactly' from the film as it was a bit vulgar, though the video of the song was released online. The premiere of Jackpot was held at PVR Cinemas in Juhu, Mumbai, on 12 December 2013 to which Shahrukh Khan, Urvashi Sharma and other celebrities came. Sunny Leone promoted the film in various cities like Gurgaon, Chandigarh, Kolkata, Mumbai, and Bangalore (Inorbit Mall). Sunny Leone and Sachin also promoted the film on the shows Bigg Boss 7 and Comedy Circus Ke Mahabali.

Box office
Jackpot grossed  on day one. It grossed  on domestic box office in its first weekend.

Critical reception
Reagan Gavin Rasquinha of Times of India gave Jackpot 2 stars out of 5. Shubhra Gupta of Indian Express gave the film a 1/2 star only. Avad M of Bollywood3 rated the film 1.5/5.

References

External links

2010s Hindi-language films
2013 films
Indian comedy thriller films
Films shot in Goa
Films about lotteries
Indian films about gambling
Films set in Goa
Lottery fraud in fiction